St. Paul's Episcopal Church Complex is a historic church on Rider Avenue at the intersection of Terry Street in Patchogue, New York. Though the official address is listed as being at 31 Rider Avenue, the actual church is located between two houses owned by the church, the southernmost of which is actually located at 31 Rider Avenue.

It was built in 1883 and added to the National Register of Historic Places in 1995.

References

External links
St. Paul's Episcopal Church of Patchogue Official Website

Churches on the National Register of Historic Places in New York (state)
Queen Anne architecture in New York (state)
Churches completed in 1883
19th-century Episcopal church buildings
Episcopal church buildings in New York (state)
Patchogue, New York
Churches in Suffolk County, New York
National Register of Historic Places in Suffolk County, New York